Straight Out of Hell is the 14th studio album by German power metal band Helloween. It was released in 2013 and produced by Charlie Bauerfeind.

Overview
Regarding the songs, guitarist and founding member Michael Weikath stated:

Three months after the album release, he commented on it again, saying he thinks it is "kind of very accessible for the listener. And it's a fun album. It's an album that doesn't give you the creeps or annoys you or whatever".

Andi Deris confirmed that Straight Out of Hell was intentionally made to be a "happy" Helloween album.  This was, according to Deris, partly in response to the band's darker material during the previous 10 years, and partly out of the band's interest in releasing a positive album in light of the failure of the 2012 Doomsday Prediction.

War and peace are the themes of the first two songs.  Opening track, "Nabataea", refers to the ancient Nabatean Kingdom, which exists in modern Jordan.  Andi Deris explained that Nabatea is "a nation which...was probably the only country which never brought war to other countries". A music video was shot for an edited version of "Nabataea".  By contrast, the acceptance of conflict by the modern world consumes the second track, "World of War", which explores how contemporary humanity takes war as inevitable and seemingly cares little about the casualties, according to Deris.

Faith is addressed in "Far From the Stars", with bassist Markus Grosskopf explaining that the strength of one's belief, whether associated with a religion or not, is essential for survival.  A different tack is taken on the last track, "Church Breaks Down", which highlights the Church's actions throughout the centuries such as its refusal to adapt to scientific developments such as the theory of evolution.

Several songs deal with the follies and occasionally strange beliefs of humanity.  "Burning Sun" is more light-hearted, introducing a protagonist who, according to Weikath, dreams of steering a spaceship into the Sun. A version of the track featuring a Hammond organ (performed by Helloween session keyboardist Matthias Ulmer) was dedicated to the late Deep Purple organist Jon Lord and is included as a bonus track on the limited and Japanese editions of the album.  On the other hand, "Waiting for the Thunder" is a piano-driven song about an unrepentant man, after doing wrong, simply awaits the punishment rather than trying to make amends. Deris conceded that, "I know sometimes I'm that guy".

In addition to the dedication of the Hammond organ version of "Burning Sun" to Jon Lord, Helloween dedicated "Wanna Be God" to the late Freddie Mercury of Queen due to its affinity to the Queen's stadium rock track, "We Will Rock You". Previously on December 12, 2012, Metal Shock Finland's Chief Editor, Mohsen Fayyazi, compared the drums of this track with a traditional Brazilian folk rhythm and also he wrote "It seems they wanted to wear QUEEN‘s shoes, as this track sounds like “We Will Rock You” by QUEEN to me"

The title track toys with heavy metal clichés while "Years" fixates upon life and death, and "Make Fire Catch the Fly" discusses the fear of rejection that may cause a person to never profess love for another.

Track listing

Regular edition

Limited edition bonus tracks

Japanese Edition bonus tracks

Personnel
 Andi Deris – vocals
 Michael Weikath – lead and rhythm guitars, backing vocals
 Sascha Gerstner – lead and rhythm guitars, backing vocals
 Markus Grosskopf – bass, backing vocals
 Daniel Löble – drums

Guest musicians
 Matthias Ulmer – keyboards

Technical staff
 Produced by Charlie Bauerfeind
 Recorded & mixed at Mi Sueño Studio in Tenerife, Spain
 Engineered & mixed by Charlie Bauerfeind for S.C. & Services
 Additional engineering & editing by Thomas Geiger
 Additional backing vocals by William "Billy" King & Olaf Senkbeil
 Cover artwork, 3D design & band photography by Martin Häusler
 Pumpkin illustrations by Marcos Moura

Charts

References

2013 albums
Helloween albums
The End Records albums
Albums produced by Charlie Bauerfeind